Old City Special Services District of Philadelphia is a municipal authority providing business improvement district services in the Old City neighborhood of Center City, Philadelphia.

Services

Sidewalk cleaning
The Old City Special Services District has a program of sidewalk cleaning with uniformed crews to sweep and clean sidewalks with hand brooms during the day. These uniformed crews also remove graffiti from poles and signs. The District also encourages and responds to complaints about graffiti from the public. The Philadelphia Streets Department cleans the cart-ways from curb line to curb line and empties the public trash receptacles.

Security
The 6th Philadelphia Police District and the Old City Special Services District work together to improve safety and security for visitors, businesses and residents.

Marketing
To encourage and increase the commercial, retail, and cultural activities in the District, the Old City Special Services District supports marketing and promotional initiatives to enhance the public image of Old City. The official website is part of those initiatives.

Planning

The District has developed and implemented a streetscape improvement plan.

Funding
Old City District is funded by an annual assessment charge on the assessed value of commercial properties within the District's boundaries.

Administration
The Old City Special Services District Authority has a nineteen-member Board of Directors representing Old City’s property owners, occupants, workers, and business owners. An executive director, who reports to the Board of Directors, manages the activities of the District and its operations.

See also
 List of municipal authorities in Philadelphia

References

External links

Special services districts in Philadelphia
Municipal authorities in Pennsylvania
Old City, Philadelphia